In antenna design theory, the phase center is the point from which the electromagnetic radiation spreads spherically outward, with the phase of the signal being equal at any point on the sphere. Apparent phase center is used to describe the phase center in a limited section of the radiation pattern.
If it is used in the context of an antenna array, one has to define a reference point from which the basevectors of the single elements are referred to. The phase center may vary, depended on the beamforming algorithm. It produces the weight vector, that may vary over time depending on the geometrical setup as well as the receive conditions.

References

 J. D. Dyson, “Determination of the Phase Center and Phase Patterns of Antennas,” in Radio Antennas for Aircraft and Aerospace Vehicles, W. T. Blackband (ed.), AGARD Conference Proceedings, No. 15, Slough, England Technivision Services, 1967.
 Y. Y. Hu, “A Method of Determining Phase Centers and Its Applications to Electromagnetic Horns,” Journal of the Franklin Institute, Vol. 271, pp. 31–39, January 1961.

Antennas